Myoporum boninense is a plant in the figwort family, Scrophulariaceae. It is a shrub with thick, fleshy, glossy leaves, white flowers in small groups and shiny lilac to pale purple fruits. It grows in coastal heath in New South Wales and Queensland in Australia and on islands in the north west Pacific Ocean.

Description
Myoporum boninense is a shrub, sometimes prostrate, others erect or spreading. They are egg-shaped, sometimes with the narrow end towards the base and both surfaces are glossy and glabrous.

There are 4 stamens which sometimes fill the upper part of the hypanthium. Flowering occurs in spring and summer and is followed by fruits which are drupes  in diameter and shiny pink, sometimes cream blotched with purple.

Taxonomy and naming
Myoporum boninense was first formally described in 1918 by Gen-ichi Koidzumi in the Botanical Magazine (Tokyo). The specific epithet (boninense) refers to the Bonin Islands.

There are two subspecies:
 Myoporum boninense Koidz. subsp. boninense occurs on the Bonin Islands to the south west of the main islands of Japan to the Mariana Islands, growing on coral limestone and sand near the sea;
 Myoporum boninense subsp. australe Chinnock occurs in New South Wales and Queensland, growing as a prostrate shrub on rocky headlands or as a taller shrub along estuarine creeks.

Distribution and habitat
Myoporum boninense occurs in coastal environments, often close to the sea in eastern Australia and smaller islands to its north.

Uses

Indigenous uses
Aboriginal people used the fruit of Myoporum boninense to add flavour to cooked foods.  They were usually considered too bitter to be eaten raw.

Used in amenity horticulture as a ground cover and looks best with regular trimming.

References

boninense
Flora of New South Wales
Lamiales of Australia
Plants described in 1918